Malešice is a cadastral district in Prague. It has population of approximately 10,000. The earliest reference about the village is from 1309. It became part of Prague on 1 January 1922. It lies mostly in the municipal and administrative district of Prague 10 while a small part is in Prague 9. The district is bordered by Strašnice, Žižkov, Hrdlořezy, Kyje, Štěrboholy and Hostivař.

References

Districts of Prague